Copson is a surname. Notable people with the surname include:

Andrew Copson (born 1980), British humanist leader and writer
Bill Copson (1908–1971), English cricketer
Edward Copson (1901–1980), British mathematician
Tom Copson (born 1984), English singer-songwriter
Mark A Copson (born 1963),English
Road Surfacing mogul and founder of MAC surfacing LTD